Qareh Tappeh (also known as Qarā Tappeh, Qara Tepe, and Qār Tappeh) is a village in Rezvaniyeh Rural District, in the Central District of Tiran and Karvan County, Isfahan Province, Iran. At the 2006 census, its population was 175, in 50 families.

References 

Populated places in Tiran and Karvan County